Symptom of the Universe: The Original Black Sabbath 1970–1978 is a compilation album released by English heavy metal band Black Sabbath in 2002.

All songs have been remastered for this compilation. The Black Box set, which was released in 2004, contained versions of the band's first eight albums remastered during the same sessions as this compilation.

Track listing
All songs written by Tony Iommi, Geezer Butler, Bill Ward, Ozzy Osbourne, except where noted.

Disc one

† - Previously unavailable in the US

Disc two

Personnel
 Dan Hersch, Bill Inglot – remastering

Release history

See also

References

2004 greatest hits albums
Black Sabbath compilation albums
Rhino Records compilation albums
Warner Records compilation albums